Millers Pond State Park is a public recreation area lying adjacent to Cockaponset State Forest in the towns of Durham and Haddam, Connecticut. The park's central feature is  Millers Pond, whose principal source of water is large springs that create a body of unpolluted water excellent for trout and smallmouth bass. The park offers fishing, hiking, mountain biking, and hunting.

History
Thomas Miller erected the upper dam in 1704 to make a reservoir to serve his downstream gristmill. Millers Pond and 170 acres of woodlands were acquired by the state in 1955 from the heirs of Thomas Macdonough Russell. The acquisition was one of several made in the 1950s using funds bequeathed by George Dudley Seymour. The state's purchase of additional land around the pond was completed in 1972.

References

External links
Millers Pond State Park Reserve Connecticut Department of Energy and Environmental Protection
Millers Pond State Park Reserve Map Connecticut Department of Energy and Environmental Protection

State parks of Connecticut
Parks in Middlesex County, Connecticut
Ponds of Connecticut
Bodies of water of Middlesex County, Connecticut
Protected areas established in 1955
1955 establishments in Connecticut
Durham, Connecticut
Haddam, Connecticut